August and Everything After is the debut studio album by American rock band Counting Crows, released September 14, 1993, on Geffen Records.  The album was produced by T Bone Burnett and featured the founding members of the band: Steve Bowman (drums), David Bryson (guitar), Adam Duritz (vocals), Charlie Gillingham (keyboards), and Matt Malley (bass).  Among the several session musicians used for the album was multi-instrumentalist David Immerglück, who later joined the band as a full-time member in 1999, as well as Burnett, who also provided additional guitar work.

Four singles were released from the album, the highest charting of which was "Mr. Jones", which peaked at number 5 on the Billboard US Radio Songs Chart and number 2 on several genre-specific Billboard charts. The album itself was well received by critics and has gone multi-platinum in several countries, including the U.S. where it has sold over seven million copies, and peaked at number 4 on the Billboard 200 album chart.

The album cover depicts handwritten lyrics to a song called "August and Everything After", but the band decided against featuring the song on the album; it was not until over a decade later that it was played as part of one of their live concerts. The song "August and Everything After" was released on January 24, 2019, as an Amazon Original.

On September 18, 2007, a two-disc deluxe edition of the album was issued. The first disc contains the original album, remastered by Adam Ayan at Gateway Mastering, with six demos added as bonus tracks. The second disc is taken from the band's penultimate performance during the August tour, recorded at the Élysée Montmartre in Paris, France, on December 9, 1994.

The album August & Everything After: Live at Town Hall was released on August 29, 2011, featuring live recordings of the songs from this album. More than 6 million copies of the album have been sold by February 2002 in the US.

Track listing

Original release

2007 deluxe edition bonus disc

Personnel 
 Steve Bowman – drums, vocals
 David Bryson – guitars, vocals
 Adam Duritz –  vocals, piano, harmonica
 Charlie Gillingham – piano, Hammond B3, accordion, Chamberlin, vocals
 Matt Malley – bass, guitar, vocals

Additional personnel
 T Bone Burnett – guitar, producer
Stephen Marcussen – mastering at Precision Mastering, Los Angeles, CA
Adam Ayan – 2007 Deluxe Edition mastering at Gateway Mastering, Portland, Maine
 Bill Dillon – guitar, guitorgan
 Denny Fongheiser – percussion, drums on track 3
 David Immerglück – guitars, mandolins, pedal steel guitar, mandocello, vocals
 Gary Louris – backing vocals
 Maria McKee – backing vocals
 Mark Olson – backing vocals

Charts

Weekly charts

Year-end charts

Decade-end charts

Certifications

References

External links

1993 debut albums
Albums produced by T Bone Burnett
Counting Crows albums
Geffen Records albums